was a Japanese samurai, student of Hirata kokugaku, and low-ranking retainer of the Naegi Domain. He also used the name .

Biography
In 1852, Aoyama enrolled in the Ibukinoya academy founded by Hirata Atsutane. At the time, the Ibukinoya was led by Atsutane's adopted heir Hirata Kanetane.

Because his superior Tōyama Tomoyoshi was both a sōshaban and wakadoshiyori, Aoyama was able to stay informed on political developments of the time. One such event was the attempted assassination of Andō Nobumasa.

During his studies under Kanetane, Aoyama inducted a number of other students into the Ibukinoya, particularly from the region surrounding his native Nakatsugawa.

The kokugaku scholar  was excommunicated by Kanetane for heresy after having sought to find precedents for Imperial dethronement. Suzuki was later murdered at his home in 1863. The assassin was allegedly Aoyama, although it is unclear if Kanetane himself had any involvement.

Aoyama and his son Naomichi assisted the new government's fledgling bureaucracy during the Boshin War. During that time, Aoyama was assigned to a post in the Department of Divinities. As part of the Hirata school's nativist program, they spearheaded a violent campaign of anti-Buddhist persecution. Shocked by this as well as the accompanying purge of Confucian education, a number of Confucian karō of Naegi planned a revolt. Aoyama detected the conspiracy, however, and orchestrated the arrests of those involved on January 12, 1870.

In 1876, the Aoyama house was destroyed by an arson attack. Aoyama himself died in 1891.

References 

1819 births
1891 deaths
Samurai
Kokugaku scholars
People of the Boshin War
Japanese nationalists
Japanese Shintoists
Meiji Restoration
Japanese assassins